Ice IV is a metastable high-pressure phase of ice.
It is formed when liquid water is compressed with an immense force.

Preparation 
Several organic nucleating reagents had been proposed to selectively crystallize ice IV from liquid water, but even with such reagents, the crystallization of ice IV from liquid water was very difficult and seemed to be a random event.

In 2001, Salzmann and his coworkers reported a whole new method to prepare ice IV reproducibly; when high-density amorphous ice (HDA) is heated at a rate of 0.4 K/min and a pressure of 0.81 GPa, ice IV is crystallized at about 165 K. What governs the crystallization products is the heating rate; fast heating (over 10 K/min) results in the formation of single-phase ice XII.

Crystal structure 
The crystal structure of ice IV was elucidated by Engelhardt and Kamb in 1981 by low-temperature single-crystal X-ray diffraction. Its structure is described by a rhombohedral unit cell with a space group of R-3c. The hydrogen geometry had been suggested to be completely disordered as IR  and Raman  spectra consist only of broad peaks, and the disordered nature was confirmed by neutron powder diffraction studies by Lobban (1998)  and Klotz et al. (2003).. In addition, the entropy difference between ice VI (disordered phase) and ice IV is very small according to Bridgman's measurement.

Engelhardt-Kamb Collapse (EKC) 
Engelhardt and Kamb mentioned in the paper in 1981 that the structure of ice IV could be derived from the structure of ice Ic by cutting and forming some hydrogen bondings and adding subtle structural distortions. Shephard et al. compressed the ambient phase of NH4F, an isostructural material of ice, to obtain NH4F II, whose hydrogen-bonded network is similar to ice IV. As the compression of ice Ih results in the formation of high-density amorphous ice (HDA), not ice IV, they claimed that the compression-induced conversion of ice I into ice IV is important, naming it "Engelhardt-Kamb collapse" (EKC). They suggested that the reason why we cannot obtain ice IV directly from ice Ih is that ice Ih is hydrogen-disordered; if oxygen atoms are arranged in the ice IV structure, hydrogen bonding may not be formed due to the donor-acceptor mismatch.

Quest for hydrogen ordering 
As discussed above, ice IV is a hydrogen-disordered phase. Its ordered counterpart, however, has never been reported yet. Salzmann et al. (2011)  reported the DSC thermograms of HCl-doped ice IV finding an endothermic feature at about 120 K. Ten years later, Rosu-Finsen and Salzmann (2021)  reported more detailed DSC data where the endothermic feature becomes larger as the sample is quench-recovered at higher pressure. They proposed three scenarios to explain the experimental results: weak hydrogen-ordering, orientational glass transition, and mechanical distortions.

References

Water ice